The Boston mayoral election of 1882 saw  the election of Albert Palmer, who defeated incumbent mayor Samuel Abbott Green.

Results

See also
List of mayors of Boston, Massachusetts

References

Mayoral elections in Boston
Boston
Boston mayoral
19th century in Boston